Anna Maria Peduzzi (12 July 1912 – 23 August 1979) was an Italian racecar driver. She raced from the 1930s to the 1950s, mostly in her native Italy. She was the first driver on record to race for Scuderia Ferrari. During her career, she also raced for Alfa Romeo, Stanguellini and Fiat.

She was from Como north of Milan and married race car test driver Franco Comotti from Bergamo in 1934. She bought an Alfa Romeo 6C 1500 Gran Sport Testa fissa in 1933 which she raced alone and occasionally with her husband, such as when they drove for Ferrari in the 1934 Mille Miglia, winning the 1.5 litre class.

The couple lived in Paris from 1936 to 1945. During this period she suffered from polio.

From 1952 to 1956 she raced Stanguellini 750 cc race cars. From 1956 to 1959, she mainly raced a 2-litre Ferrari 500 TR, initially with Belgian driver Gilberte Thiroin.  Peduzzi's last race seems to have been in 1961 in an Alfa Romeo Giulietta.

Her husband died in Bergamo in 1963. Peduzzi died in 1979 in the same town.

References

Italian racing drivers
Italian female racing drivers
1912 births
1979 deaths
People from Como